Thomas William Craig (born 3 September 1995) is an Australian field hockey player who plays as a midfielder for the Australian national team.

Career

Junior national team
In 2016, Craig was a member of the Australian Under 21 team, 'The Burras', who were victorious at the Junior Oceania Cup, which served as a qualifier for the Junior World Cup. Craig was also a member of the team at the Junior World Cup in Lucknow, India, where the team finished fourth.

Senior national team
Craig made his senior international debut in a test series against India in 2014, before competing the Champions Trophy in Bhubaneswar, India.

Craig has become a regular inclusion in the Australian team since his debut, and most notably was a member of the team at the 2018 Commonwealth Games where the team won a gold medal.

In November 2018, Craig was named in the squad for the Hockey World Cup in Bhubaneswar, India. The Kookaburras came 3rd, after losing the semi-final to the Netherlands (2-2 Regular time, 4-3 Shootouts), but beating England 8–1 in the Bronze Medal match. Craig scoring 4 Goals from the tournament, including the Hattrick in the Bronze Medal match.

Craig was a part of the team that won the Inaugural FIH Pro League in 2019, Defeating Belgium in the Grand Final 3–2, scoring 3 Goals for the Kookaburras throughout the Campaign.

Craig was selected in the Kookaburras Olympics squad for the Tokyo 2020 Olympics. The team reached the final for the first time since 2004 but couldn't achieve gold, beaten by Belgium in a shootout.

Domestic Hockey
In 2019 Craig was a member of the NSW Pride that took out the Inaugural Hockey One competition alongside fellow Kookaburras selected from the Tournament, including Flynn Ogilvie, Tim Brand, Lachlan Sharp, Matt Dawson, Kurt Lovett and Blake Govers. After the 2020 Summer Olympics he joined Dutch Hoofdklasse club Klein Zwitserland.

References

External links
 
 
 
 

1995 births
Living people
Australian male field hockey players
Male field hockey midfielders
Commonwealth Games medallists in field hockey
Commonwealth Games gold medallists for Australia
Field hockey players at the 2018 Commonwealth Games
2018 Men's Hockey World Cup players
Field hockey players at the 2020 Summer Olympics
Olympic field hockey players of Australia
Men's Hoofdklasse Hockey players
HC Klein Zwitserland players
Olympic silver medalists for Australia
Medalists at the 2020 Summer Olympics
Olympic medalists in field hockey
21st-century Australian people
Sportsmen from New South Wales
Australian expatriate sportspeople in the Netherlands
Expatriate field hockey players
2023 Men's FIH Hockey World Cup players
Field hockey people from New South Wales
Medallists at the 2018 Commonwealth Games